Nevesinje is a town and municipality located in the Republika Srpska entity of Bosnia and Herzegovina. As of 2013, the town has a population of 5,162 inhabitants, while the municipality has 12,961 inhabitants.

Geography and climate

Geography
A large polje called Nevesinjsko polje dominates the municipality, and is encircled by mountains of Crvanj at the north-northeast, Prenj at the northwest, and Velež at the south-southwest.

History

The annals of the Patriarchal Monastery of Peć mentioned Nevesinje in 1219, which is the earliest appearance of Nevesinje in preserved historical sources. The župa (county) of Nevesinje was held by Serbian prince Stefan Konstantin between 1303–06.

Chronicle of the Priest of Duklja mentions Nevesinje in the 12th century, as a part of the Podgorica župa.

Numerous contracts between craftsmen and other service providers from modern-day Nevesinje and the Republic of Dubrovnik are stored in the Dubrovnik archives.

The Nevesinje area was the scene of numerous robberies and crimes in the Middle ages, which has been recorded several times in the Dubrovnik archives.

The region was under the rule of different medieval lords until the end of the 15th century. The most significant ruler of Nevesinje from this period was Bosnian nobleman Stjepan Vukčić Kosača, known as Herceg Stefan. The whole land Herzegovina was named after him. His lands were under constant threat from advancing Ottoman forces in the 15th century. Herzegovina, and thus Nevesinje were gradually incorporated into the Ottoman Empire by the first quarter of the 15th century (1422).

There is a large number of stećak tombstones in the Nevesinje area. Every village in the Nevesinje municipality contains a number of stećak tombstones, while the village of Krekovi has the most medieval necropolises in Bosnia and Herzegovina.

In 1463, the Ottoman headquarters was established in the vicinity of Nevesinje. Within a few years they had conquered and placed under their administration the whole župa.

The Ottomans conducted a census of the villages by villages first 1468–1469 and then 1475–1477. Most of the villages mentioned in the Middle Ages contained the same names to this day. The voluntary conversion of part of the population to Islam has also been noticed in the available defectors, most likely due to high taxes and other levies.

Under the Ottoman Empire, Nevesinje was mostly part of Bosnian Pashaluk and was a seat of a qadi. The Great Eastern Crisis was ignited at Nevesinje, with the outbreak of the Herzegovinian rebellion of 1875–78 when Serbs of the region rebelled against Ottoman tax collectors. The rebellion soon spread to the rest of Herzegovina and to Bosnia and other parts of the Ottoman Empire.

Neighboring states, Serbia, Montenegro and Bulgaria got involved in the conflict which in turn pulled in great powers of the time. The conflict ended with Congress of Berlin in 1878 and the province of Bosnia and Herzegovina was placed under the administration of Austria-Hungary. At the same time Romania, Serbia and Montenegro were declared independent principalities.

In 2019, Nevesinje experienced a power outage that was named one of the worst crises in the country of Bosnia.

Settlements
Aside from the village of Nevesinje, there are 55 other settlements that comprise the municipality:

 Batkovići
 Bežđeđe
 Biograd
 Bojišta
 Borovčići
 Bratač
 Budisavlje
 Ćesim
 Donja Bijenja
 Donji Drežanj
 Donji Lukavac
 Dramiševo
 Gaj
 Gornja Bijenja
 Gornji Drežanj
 Gornji Lukavac
 Grabovica
 Hrušta
 Humčani
 Jasena
 Jugovići
 Kifino Selo
 Kljen
 Kljuna
 Kovačići
 Krekovi
 Kruševljani
 Lakat
 Luka
 Miljevac
 Odžak
 Plužine
 Podgrađe
 Postoljani
 Presjeka
 Pridvorci
 Prkovići
 Rabina
 Rast
 Rilja
 Rogače
 Seljani
 Slato
 Sopilja
 Studenci
 Šehovina
 Šipačno
 Trusina
 Udrežnje
 Zaborani
 Zalom
 Zalužje
 Zovi Do
 Žiljevo
 Žuberin

Demographics

Population

Ethnic composition

Economy
The following table gives a preview of total number of registered people employed in legal entities per their core activity (as of 2018):

Transport
Nevesinje's bus station offers daily buses to Podgorica, Nikšić and Danilovgrad in Montenegro via the towns Gacko, Bileća and Trebinje within Bosnia and Herzegovina. Local buses link the town with nearby larger metropolitan city of Mostar, the common destination of commutes. The bus station also offers direct routes to major transportation hubs of Dubrovnik in Croatia and Belgrade in Serbia.

Notable people
 Pero Zubac, writer
 Safvet-beg Bašagić, writer
 Borislav Arapović, poet, linguist, literary scholar
 Dražen Bogopenec, was a county lord (župan) in Zagorje
 dr Špiro Soldo, leader of the secret society "Freedom" established in 1905/1906
 Ratko Radovanović, basketball player

References

Sources
 Kapidžić, dr Hamdija: Hercegovački ustanak 1882.godine, Sarajevo, "Veselin Masleša", 1958.

External links

 
 Virtualna Hercegovina website

 
Populated places in Nevesinje
Cities and towns in Republika Srpska